Piano Sonata No. 20 may refer to:
Piano Sonata No. 20 (Beethoven)
Piano Sonata in B-flat major, K. 498a, formerly considered Piano Sonata No. 20 by Mozart
Piano Sonata No. 20 (Schubert)